UPF0575 protein C19orf67 is a protein which in humans (Homo sapiens) is encoded by the C19orf67 gene. Orthologs of C19orf67 are found in many mammals, some reptiles, and most jawed fish. The protein is expressed at low levels throughout the body with the exception of the testis and breast tissue. Where it is expressed, the protein is predicted to be localized in the nucleus to carry out a function. The highly conserved and slowly evolving DUFF3314 region is predicted to form numerous alpha helices and may be vital to the function of the protein.

Gene 
In humans, C19orf67 is located on the minus strand of Chromosome 19 at 19p13.12 and spans 4,163 base pairs (bp).

The following genes are found near C19orf67 on the positive strand:
 MISP3
 Eukaryotic Translation Elongation Factor 1 Delta Pseudogene 1 (EEF1DP1)
 MicroRNA 1199 (MIR1199)
The following genes are found near C19orf67 on the minus strand:
 catalytic subunit α of protein kinase A (PRKACA)
 Sterile Alpha Motif Domain Containing 1 (SAMD1)

mRNA transcript 
C19orf67 has three transcript variants, although the second and third variants are only predicted by an Ensembl analysis and not experimentally confirmed. Only the first two variants are protein-coding transcripts.

The first transcript consists of 1447bp while the second and third have 751bp and 656bp respectively. The mature mRNA of the longest isoform is made up from 6 exons.

Protein 
The unmodified protein has 358 amino acids, predicted molecular weight of 40kDa, charge of -11, and isoelectric point of 5. 44 prolines were found along the protein, making up 12.3% of the total amino acid sequence. The proline content by percentage was found to be higher in UPF0575 than 95% of comparable human proteins. However, the amount of asparagine the protein is less abundant when compared to the human proteome.

Domains
Both isoforms contain DUF3314. Although the function is not yet well understood, conservation among numerous taxa indicate that it may be important to the function of the protein. The first isoform has a non-repeating proline-rich region from amino acids 12 to 80. The function of the region is not well understood but it may be involved in preventing helices from forming due to the rigid structure of proline.

Secondary structure
A cross-program consensus predicted that UPF0575 protein C19orf67 forms four alpha helices and two beta sheets in the following locations in the amino acid sequence:

Post-translational modifications 
Acetylation is likely to occur at the N-terminus while the C-terminus is unlikely to be modified. O-Glycosylation is predicted to occur at amino acids 18 and 67. Several possible phosphorylation sites were identified along with the associated kinases:

Subcellular localization 
UPF0575 protein C19orf67 is expected to be targeted in the nucleus, specifically the nucleolus.

Expression and regulation

Regulation of gene expression 
The promoter region is predicted to start 1,303 bp upstream from the 5' UTR and consist of 1,447 bp, causing 144 bp to overlap with the 5' UTR.

A number of transcription factors  such as FOXP1, SOX5, SOX6, SOX4, and MZF1 are likely to bind with the promoter, often acting to downregulate transcription. When regarding the expression of other genes, these transcription factors typically play a role in the development of various tissues such as the heart, lung, and also take part in the differentiation of early embryonic cells, and red blood cells.

Transcriptional regulation 
It is suspected that the mature mRNA of C19orf67 forms a stem loop on the 3' UTR that spans from 1,296bp to 1,350bp of the transcript.

Tissue expression 
In humans, UPF0575 protein C19orf67 is highly expressed in the testis and breast tissue, although it is also expressed at low levels  in the stomach, cerebral cortex, thyroid gland, and salivary gland.

The protein product is less abundant than most of the human proteome in many tissues.

Homology

Paralogs 
There are no known paralogs of UPF0575 protein C19orf67, nor are there any known paralogous domains of DUF3314 found.

Orthologs 
Orthologs of UPF0575 protein C19orf67 were found to be present among a wide variety of mammals with it being particularly well represented in rodentia and primates. Orthologs were also found in each reptilian order but were much more scarce in presence relative to mammals.  A high number and variety of ray-finned fishes were found to have orthologs while there were fewer cartilaginous fish found to have orthologs; no jawless fish could be found with orthologs.

No orthologs are known to be present in birds or amphibians. No invertebrates, fungi, bacteria, or lower species have known orthologs.

BLAT and BLAST were used to create following table as a sample ortholog space for UPF0575 protein C19orf67. This table is not a complete list of orthologs, it is meant to display the span in which there are orthologs and the diversity of those species.

Molecular evolution 
UPF0575 protein C19orf67 consists of one family and there are no apparent duplications throughout the evolution of UPF0575 protein C19orf67.

The DUF3314 region of the gene appears to have diverged at a slower rate relative to the rest of the gene, indicating that that region may have been undergoing purifying selection because that region played an important role in the protein.

Clinical significance 
In one case study, C19orf67 was one of 29 genes on chromosome 19 lost due to deletions caused by chromosomal rearrangements. The rearrangements resulted neural development issues and behavioral abnormalities, although it is not known whether C19orf67 played an active role in the resulting phenotypes. In a different study, when a portion of chromosome 19 that also included C19orf67 was deleted, developmental issues such as Intrauterine growth restriction, premature birth, and muscular hypotonia, occurred.

C19orf67, among many other genes, may be used as a possible marker to detect mature beta cells.

References 

Proteins